Carlo Morris (born 13 January 1980) is a Barbadian cricketer. He played in six first-class, ten List A, and thirteen Twenty20 matches for the Barbados cricket team from 2006 to 2012.

See also
 List of Barbadian representative cricketers

References

External links
 

1980 births
Living people
Barbadian cricketers
Barbados cricketers